The Orinduik Falls lie on the Ireng River, a highland river that thunders over steps and terraces of red jasper on the border of Guyana and Brazil before merging with the Takutu River and into Brazil to join the Amazon River.

The falls are situated amid the rolling, grass-covered hills of the Pakaraima Mountains. Orinduik Falls is a wide, multi-tiered series of cascades making it an ideal waterfall for swimming. Waterfall is approximately 25 m tall and more than 150 m wide.

There are other waterfalls on Ireng River, including the approximately 100 m tall Kurutuik Falls located more than 40 km to the north, but due to hard accessibility these falls are rarely visited.

The area is inhabited by Macushi and Patamona people, and there are a  few villages in the vicinity of the falls.

Tourism 
Orinduik Falls is one of the main tourist attractions in Guyana. The falls lie at the edge of the Pakaraima Mountains.  There are frequent flights from Ogle Airport and Cheddi Jagan International Airport in Georgetown and most tours are combined with Kaieteur Falls. The Ministry of Tourism facilitates an annual safari through Region 8 and 9 with the falls as a major point of interest.

References

Waterfalls of Guyana
Waterfalls of Brazil
International waterfalls
Brazil–Guyana border
Landforms of Roraima